Nicolas Lopez (born 8 March 2003) is a Bahamian footballer.

Early and personal life
Lopez was born in Freeport, Bahamas. He moved to Nassau, Bahamas in 2015 where he attended Lyford Cay International School until 2021.

Playing career 
Lopez's current club is the Northeastern Men's Club Soccer team. His first national team call-up came during the 2019 CONCACAF League and he debuted off the bench against Bonaire on November 17th, 2019.

Career statistics

International

References

2003 births
Living people
Association football midfielders
Bahamian footballers
Bahamas international footballers